Richard Fromberg was the defending champion, but did not compete this year.

Magnus Gustafsson won the title by defeating Alberto Mancini 6–1, 6–2 in the final.

Seeds

Draw

Finals

Top half

Bottom half

References

External links
 Official results archive (ATP)
 Official results archive (ITF)

Singles